Karnataka Vikas Party (Karnataka Development Party), was a regional political party in Karnataka, India, formed when Sarekoppa Bangarappa left the Indian National Congress in 1996. KVP later reunified with Congress.

See also
Indian National Congress breakaway parties

Defunct political parties in Karnataka
1996 establishments in Karnataka
Indian National Congress breakaway groups